Dolcelatte (literally 'sweet milk') is a blue veined Italian soft cheese. The cheese is made from cow's milk and has a sweet taste.

Dolcelatte was created by the Galbani Company (now part of Groupe Lactalis) and the name is a registered trademark. Dolcelatte was developed for the British market to provide a milder smelling and tasting alternative to the famous traditional Italian blue cheese, Gorgonzola. 

The production method for dolcelatte is similar to the methods used to make Gorgonzola. One difference is that it is made from the curd of only one milking, which makes it harder. It takes about two to three months to produce and age this cheese. The fat content of dolcelatte is higher than Gorgonzola at about 50%. Dolcelatte is comparable in taste and texture to dolceverde and torte gaudenzio cheese.

See also
 List of cheeses

References

Italian cheeses
Cow's-milk cheeses
Blue cheeses